Alfred Roy Parsons  (24 May 1925 – 19 June 2010) was an Australian diplomat from 1947 to 1988. He 
was the Australian High Commissioner to the United Kingdom from 1983 to 1987, only the second career diplomat to hold the position.

Parsons was born in Hobart and educated at Hobart High School and the University of Tasmania. He joined the Department of External Affairs (now the Department of Foreign Affairs and Trade) in Canberra in 1947. He was posted to Australian missions in Jakarta, Rangoon, Singapore, Kuala Lumpur, Berlin, the United Nations (New York City), and London. His postings to Singapore, Kuala Lumpur and London were as High Commissioner. From 1976 to 1984, he was a Deputy Secretary of the department, responsible for Asian affairs.

He died in Canberra in 2010, aged 85, survived by his wife, Jill, two sons and a daughter.

Honours
 Appointed an Officer of the Order of Australia (AO) on 9 June 1986 for "Public service as a diplomatic representative".
 Awarded the Centenary Medal on 1 January 2001 for "A significant contribution over many years to international relations".

References

1925 births
2010 deaths
High Commissioners of Australia to Singapore
High Commissioners of Australia to Malaysia
High Commissioners of Australia to the United Kingdom
Permanent Representatives of Australia to the International Maritime Organization
Officers of the Order of Australia
Recipients of the Centenary Medal
University of Tasmania alumni
People from Hobart
People from Canberra